"Love Is in Control (Finger on the Trigger)" is a Grammy-nominated single from Donna Summer's self-titled 1982 album. The single was her 12th top 10 hit on the Billboard Hot 100 chart.

Background
Summer's 1980 The Wanderer album — her inaugural release on Geffen Records — had been certified gold in America although it did not enjoy numerous hit singles as some of her '70s releases had enjoyed. Summer had prepped her next album, which would be released in 1996 as I'm a Rainbow — a double set which continued her association with Giorgio Moroder and Pete Bellotte, but David Geffen, decided to cancel the project, and assigned Summer to record an album with producer Quincy Jones. Jones was a much sought-after producer at the time, particularly due to his association with Michael Jackson's album Off the Wall.

"Love Is in Control (Finger on the Trigger)" was the lead single off the Jones' produced album Donna Summer. It was written by Jones and Rod Temperton (formerly of funk band Heatwave) — who'd also written Jackson's "Rock with You". Summer reported that the recording process for this album was challenging, as she was pregnant at the time and unhappy over I'm a Rainbow' being shelved by Geffen Records.

The single was issued in three different versions: the 7" single release (3:42), the LP version (4:19), and a 12" single version (7:04). The 12" version features a "Dance Remix" on Side One and an "Instrumental Version Featuring Ernie Watts On Sax Solo" on Side Two. Both are remixes by Craig Kostich and Bruce Swedien.

Music video
A music video features Donna Summer dancing in a room full of pop art.  She wore a black satin outfit to disguise her pregnancy as she was expecting her baby, Amanda Grace.  The video also featured clips of Donna dancing during a photo shoot wearing a blue dress with a large belt to cover her stomach. The same dress (outfit) is what she is wearing on the cover for the single and album.

Reception
"Love Is in Control (Finger on the Trigger)" became a major hit, peaking at no. 10 on the US Billboard Hot 100 on the week of September 25, 1982, giving Summer her sixteenth top 40 hit, and reaching no. 4 on the US R&B Chart. It was Summer's best R&B showing since "Bad Girls" in 1979—even using police whistles in the song as in "Bad Girls". Although the parent album was certified gold in the US, it did not produce any more major hits and did not prove the powerhouse album Geffen Records had hoped for.

Chart performance

Weekly charts

Year-end charts

B-side
The B-side of the "Love Is in Control" 7" single, "Sometimes Like Butterflies", was a non-album track co-written by Summer herself. It was finally released on CD on the 2014 reissue and was also covered in 1985 by Dusty Springfield.

References

1982 songs
1982 singles
Donna Summer songs
Geffen Records singles
Warner Records singles
Songs written by Quincy Jones
Songs written by Rod Temperton